Union Building(s) may refer to:

 Union Building (Manhattan), or Decker Building, New York City, US
 Union Building (University of Texas at Austin), US
 Union Building, Aldershot, UK
 Union Building, Hong Kong, demolished in 1950, on the site of the present Chater House
 Union Building, Shanghai, China
 Union Building, Toronto, Canada
 Union Buildings, Pretoria, South Africa
 Union Buildings, on the campus of the University of Adelaide, Australia